Neuropilin 2 (NRP2) is a protein that in humans is encoded by the NRP2 gene.

This gene encodes a member of the neuropilin family of receptor proteins. NRP2 is expressed by a wide variety of cell types. The transmembrane protein has been reported to bind to SEMA3C, SEMA3F, VEGF-A, VEGF-C, VEGF-D, TGFβ, integrins and ANGPTL4 to promote downstream signaling pathways. Consequently, NRP2 is known to play a role in cardiovascular development, axon guidance, tumorigenesis, inflammation and cardiovascular disease. Multiple transcript variants encoding distinct isoforms have been identified for this gene.

References

Further reading